In computer science, occam-π (or occam-pi) is the name of a variant of the programming language occam developed by the Kent Retargetable occam Compiler (KRoC) team at the University of Kent. The name reflects the introduction of elements of π-calculus (pi-calculus) into occam, especially concepts involving mobile agents (processes) and data. The language contains several extensions to occam 2.1, including:

Nested protocols
Run-time process creation
Mobile channels, data, and processes
Recursion
Protocol inheritance
Array constructors
Extended rendezvous

See also
 occam (programming language)
 Transputer
 KRoC
 Transterpreter

References

External links 
 
 University of Kent Occam-pi project page
 Tock Occam compiler
 Parallel programming users group on Occam-pi

Concurrent programming languages
University of Kent